Tomsky (masculine), Tomskaya (feminine), or Tomskoye (neuter) may refer to:
Mikhail Tomsky (1880–1936), Russian Bolshevik leader
Nikolai Tomsky (1900–1984), Russian sculptor
Tomsky District, a district of Tomsk Oblast, Russia
Tomsky (inhabited locality) (Tomskaya, Tomskoye), several rural localities in Russia
Tomsk Oblast (Tomskaya oblast), a federal subject of Russia